Sally Face is an indie adventure game created by Steve Gabry a.k.a. Portable Moose. The game follows the titular main character Sal Fisher (otherwise known as Sally Face), a boy with a prosthetic face, who investigates local murders with his friends. The game consists of 5 episodes that were released between 2016–2019. Sally Face was also released on Nintendo Switch in 2021 and later on Playstation 4 and Xbox One in 2022.

Gameplay 
Sally Face is a point-and-click adventure game that includes narrative, exploration, and puzzle-solving, combined with the direct control of the player via sidescrolling. Players are encouraged to talk to game characters and explore the environments to uncover hidden parts of the story and can return to environments in later timelines to see how things have changed. Each episode of Sally Face contains optional puzzles that reveal more of the story. The game also includes various minigames that break up the regular gameplay.

Plot 
Note: This summary is told linearly, in-game the main plot of the first four episodes are told as flashbacks recounted by an older Sal.

Episode 1: Strange Neighbors

Sal Fisher, a 15-year-old boy with a prosthetic face moves with his father to the Addison Apartments building in the town of Nockfell. The day before their arrival one of the other residents, Mrs. Sanderson, was murdered. Sal explores and meets the other tenants, including Larry Johnson, who reveals he witnessed the murder. Sal helps Larry find evidence that the murderer was one of the other tenants, Charley Mansfield. They present the evidence to the police and he is arrested. In the present, Sal recounts the story to his therapist, Dr. Enon, as he is on death row for mass murder.

Episode 2: The Wretched 

Several months later Larry tells Sal that he feels he has been cursed by a demon in the building. Sal promises to help him and goes to Todd Morrison, a tenant their age who creates gadgets. Todd modifies Sal's "Gear Boy" to be able to detect supernatural spots and the three of them explore the building. On the top floor, which is under renovation, Sal enters a secret room, where he encounters the demon. Larry steps in to save Sal and eliminates the demon with a gadget made by Todd. In the present, Sal is taken away while Enon visits the treehouse, where he is scared by the ghost of Larry and is killed after he falls from the tree, breaking his neck.

Episode 3: The Bologna Incident

More than a year later Sal and his friends decide to investigate the strange-tasting bologna at their school. After discovering that it is produced by the math teacher Mrs. Packerton, who lives in Addison Apartments, Sal and Larry decide to break into her apartment. Here they find that the bologna is being made of human meat and that Mrs. Packerton's husband is possessed by an unknown entity, who they euthanize. Their friend Ashley Campbell discovers a hidden trash chute but falls down it. Sal, Larry, and Todd find that the chute leads to an occult temple underneath the building, where they save Ashley. Mrs. Packerton is killed in a car crash.

Episode 4: The Trial

Five years later a now-adult Sal lives with Todd in a house down the road from Addison Apartments, where they have spent the last years investigating the cult. Ashley comes to visit and she and Sal meet at a lake. That night, Sal receives strange messages from Larry and rushes to the apartments, only to find that Larry has committed suicide. Sal and Larry's ghost together work their way through the apartment building, where it is shown in the otherworld that all the residents are overgrown with a strange growth. When Sal reaches Terrence Addison, the owner of the building who never leaves his room, he finds that a fleshy green mass has possessed him since he was a child. Sal defeats the mass but an apparition of Terrence tells him he must kill all the infected tenants to end the infestation for good. Reluctantly, Sal obliges and murders all the residents. In the Lobby, he finds Todd, who has been possessed by the demon. Ashley had arrived at the apartment complex moments before, and upon opening the door she unveils a covered-in-blood Sal and calls the authorities. Sal is immediately arrested as they come. 

Two years later Sal is put on trial and, despite Ashley's best efforts, sentenced to death. Ashley later finds proof of Sal's story in the form of a picture of Larry's ghost but arrives too late to save Sal, witnessing his death.

Episode 5: Memories and Dreams

After Sal's death, Ashley continues Todd's investigations of the cult. She places explosives in the main cult temple, however, she is unable to bring herself to detonate them. Believing Sal is destined to destroy the cult she begins a ritual to revive him, and slits her wrist to become a physical host for his spirit, temporarily keeping her alive and giving her special abilities. They go to the temple, where Ashley, Sal's spirit, and the ghost of Larry defeat "The Endless", the core entity of the cult, saving Todd from the cult's possession. Larry's ghost vanishes, leaving the others to grieve him. Even after the group's best efforts to save the world from the cult, it is later revealed in the unlockable epilogue, that 33% of the planet's population had been consumed by darkness.

Development 
Sally Face was developed by the indie game studio Portable Moose, composed of solo developer Steve Gabry. The game took five years to develop. It was developed using the Unity game engine. While Steve first invented the concept and world of Sally Face around 2006/2007, development on the game didn't officially start until 2015. Steve cites 90s cartoons and personal nightmares as his main inspiration. In 2016, an Indiegogo crowdfunding campaign, netting the game $13,697, allowed Steve Gabry to start working on Sally Face full-time. Sally Face, Episode One: Strange Neighbors was released August 16, 2016, on itch.io and December 14 on Steam. Episode Two: The Wretched was released July 7, 2017. Episode Three: The Bologna Incident was released on February 10, 2018. Episode Four: The Trial was released on November 30, 2018. Episode Five: Memories and Dreams was the final episode and was released on December 13, 2019.

Reception 
Sally Face has been overall positively received by critics. Gamers Decide website put Sally Face in their Top 10 Best Indie Narrative Games. Nerdvana called it "a psychological horror masterpiece" and praised the game for evoking strong emotions. Adventure Gamers critiques Sally Face for being convoluted and for hiding important story elements behind optional puzzles but ultimately said it's "is a worthwhile and wholly unique gaming experience that has to be played to be believed."

Awards 
Winner, "Indie of the Year 2018" - IndieDB

Finalist, "Indie - Digital" - Let's Play PA 2017

Top 100, "Indie of the Year" - IndieDB

References 

2016 video games
Adventure games
Horror video games
Linux games
MacOS games
Mystery video games
Nintendo Switch games
Single-player video games
Video games about cults
Video games about ghosts
Video games about mental health
Video games developed in the United States
Indie video games
Video games set in the 1990s
Video games set in the 2000s
Windows games